The 2018 Brown Bears football team represented Brown University in the 2018 NCAA Division I FCS football season. They were led by 21st-year head coach Phil Estes and played their home games at Brown Stadium. They were a member of the Ivy League. They finished the season 1–9, 0–7 in Ivy League play to finish in last place. Brown averaged 4,112 fans per game.

Previous season
The Bears finished the 2017 season 2–8, 0–7 in Ivy League play to finish in eighth place.

Schedule
The 2018 schedule consisted of five home games and five away games. The Bears hosted Ivy League foes Harvard, Cornell, Penn, and Columbia, and traveled to Princeton, Yale, and Dartmouth.

In 2018, Brown's non-conference opponents were Cal Poly of the Big Sky Conference, Georgetown of the Patriot League, and Rhode Island of the Colonial Athletic Association.

Game summaries

at Cal Poly

Harvard

Georgetown

at Rhode Island

at Princeton

Cornell

Penn

at Yale

Columbia

at Dartmouth

References

Brown
Brown Bears football seasons
Brown Bears football